Jozef Piedfort (20 May 1930 – 26 March 2008) was a Belgian football player. He scored the most goals (184) in the Belgian Second Division after World War II. In the first division he scored 8 goals in 29 games. He was the most successful striker for K. Lyra, a team from Lier, Belgium.

References

1930 births
2008 deaths
Association football forwards
Belgian Pro League players
Belgian footballers
Challenger Pro League players
Belgium international footballers
K. Lyra players
KFC Turnhout players
People from Lille, Belgium
Footballers from Antwerp Province